The Jacksonville Port Terminal Railroad  is a short line terminal railroad run by Watco. It serves the Jacksonville Port Authority and tenants with over ten miles of track. It has only one main line, running west from the Tallyrand Marine Terminal on the St Johns River to an interchange with CSX and Norfolk Southern northeast of downtown Jacksonville, Florida. Formerly known as the Talleyrand Terminal Railroad. Operations began on July 28, 1996, under that name. On March 8, 2017, Watco bought the railroad and renamed it the Jacksonville Port Terminal Railroad.

References

External links
Official Page

Florida railroads
Switching and terminal railroads
Transport infrastructure completed in 1996
Transportation in Jacksonville, Florida
Watco
1996 establishments in Florida